Tour de Feminin – O cenu Českého Švýcarska (Tour de Feminin – Krásná Lípa) is a women's staged cycle race which takes place in the Czech Republic and is rate by the UCI as a 2.2 race.

Honours

References

International cycle races hosted by the Czech Republic
Women's road bicycle races